The American Music Award for Favorite Duo or Group – Country has been awarded since 1974. Years reflect the year in which the awards were presented, for works released in the previous year (until 2003 onward when awards were handed out on November of the same year). The all-time winner in this category is Alabama with 17 wins.

Winners and nominees

1970s

1980s

1990s

2000s

2010s

2020s

Category facts

Multiple wins

 17 wins
 Alabama

 5 wins
 Brooks & Dunn

 4 wins
 Dan + Shay
 Florida Georgia Line
 Lady Antebellum
 Rascal Flatts

 3 wins
 The Statler Brothers
 Conway Twitty and Loretta Lynn

 2 wins
 Dixie Chicks

Multiple nominations

 18 nominations
 Alabama

 17 nominations
 Brooks & Dunn

 12 nominations
 The Statler Brothers

 9 nominations
 Florida Georgia Line
 The Oak Ridge Boys

 8 nominations
 Rascal Flatts
 Zac Brown Band

 7 nominations
 The Judds
 Lady Antebellum

 6 nominations
 Old Dominion

 5 nominations
 Dan + Shay
 Dixie Chicks

 4 nominations
 Conway Twitty and Loretta Lynn
 Lonestar

 3 nominations
 George Jones and Tammy Wynette

 2 nominations
 The Band Perry
 Big & Rich
 BlackHawk
 Little Big Town
 Little Texas
 Willie Nelson 
 Marie Osmond 
 Kenny Rogers 
 Sawyer Brown
 Sugarland

References

American Music Awards
Country music awards
Awards established in 1974
1974 establishments in the United States